Conness may refer to:

 John Conness (1821–1909), American politician and US senator from California
 Robert Conness (1867–1941), American actor
 Mount Conness, a mountain in California
 Conness Glacier, on the northeast cirque of the mountain
 Conness Lakes, a group of lakes at the foot of the glacier